The Juvenile Scientific Pictorial, or Children's Science Pictorial, Scientific Pictorial for Young People, is a juvenile popular science comic magazine published in Chinese launched in January 1979 and based in Beijing. The ISSN number of the publication is ISSN 1000-7776.

Juvenile Scientific Pictorial is the illustrated popular science magazine for children and teenagers in the People's Republic of China, suitable for elementary school students from grade 1 to 6, and is published once a month.

History
Juvenile Scientific Pictorial was presented by Beijing Publishing House Publishing Group. In 2003, a new color printing of the publication was brought out.

References

Popular science magazines
Magazines established in 1979
Magazines published in Beijing